Francis Koumba (born 16 July 1970) is a Gabonese footballer. He played in 43 matches for the Gabon national football team from 1993 to 2002. He was also named in Gabon's squad for the 1994 African Cup of Nations tournament.

References

External links
 

1970 births
Living people
Gabonese footballers
Gabon international footballers
1994 African Cup of Nations players
1996 African Cup of Nations players
Association football defenders
Sportspeople from Libreville
21st-century Gabonese people